Capão may refer to the following places in Brazil:

Capão Alto, Santa Catarina
Capão Bonito, São Paulo
Capão da Canoa, Rio Grande do Sul
Capão do Cipó, Rio Grande do Sul
Capão do Leão, Rio Grande do Sul
Capão Grande River, Paraná